Andrey Garbuzov may refer to:

 Andrei Garbuzov (born 1984), Russian football player
 Andrey Garbuzov (rugby union) (born 1983), Russian rugby union player